Umbonella is a genus of sea snails, marine gastropod mollusks in the family Trochidae, the top snails (unassigned to a subfamily).

It was previously considered a subgenus of Isanda H. Adams & A. Adams, 1854

Species
Species within the genus Umbonella include:
 Umbonella sismondae (Issel, 1869)
 Species brought into synonymy
 Umbonella murrea Reeve, 1863: synonym of Isanda murrea (Reeve, 1848)

References

 
Trochidae
Monotypic gastropod genera